Therapy (1995) is a novel by British author David Lodge.

The story concerns a successful sitcom writer, Laurence Passmore, plagued by middle-age neuroses and a failed marriage. His only problem seems to be an "internal derangement of the knee" but a mid-life crisis has struck and he is discovering angst. His familiar doses of cognitive therapy, aromatherapy, and acupuncture all offer no help, and he becomes obsessed with the philosophy of Kierkegaard. Moreover, Tubby, as Passmore is nicknamed, and referred to by several characters in the novel, undertakes a pilgrimage to Santiago de Compostela in order to find his first love.

Structure of the novel 

The novel is divided into four parts. The first part is written as a journal, the second part is written in dramatic monologues, the third part consists of journal entries and a memoir and the fourth part is a narrative written after the events happened and Tubby has returned to London.

In the first part, Tubby starts writing a journal triggered by a description he had to write for his cognitive behavior therapist. Before that Tubby wrote only screenplays but no narrative texts. During the writing Tubby reflects upon his problems and depression.

The dramatic monologues seem to present an outward look on Tubby but the reader finds out later that the monologues were written by Tubby himself which ruins the objectivity of this part. The reader cannot step out of Tubby's perspective but reads everything filtered through his eyes.

In the third part, the reader is presented the memoir about Maureen, Tubby's first love and his first girlfriend. It is by writing down their story that Tubby realizes what his problem is: he betrayed Maureen by dumping her in front of their friends.

The fourth part is written by Tubby looking backward on the events. He tells about his travel to Spain where he searched for Maureen on the Way of St. James. It is there, that Tubby comes to terms with his problems and finds peace.

Kierkegaardian philosophy 

While writing his journal and looking up words and names, Tubby encounters the writings of Søren Kierkegaard. A list of Kierkegaard book titles catches his attention and motivates him to delve into Kierkegaard's journals and publications. Tubby feels that he and Kierkegaard have experienced similar difficulties.  For example, Tubby likens his being mocked in a magazine article to Kierkegaard's Corsair Affair; and the way Tubby dumps Maureen, he feels, is akin to Kierkegaard's breakup with Regine.  Tubby struggles to find a way out of his depression. Even though Tubby denies Christianity it may be interpreted that he undergoes the three (Kierkegaardian) existential stages of 'the Aesthetic', 'the Ethical' and 'the Religious' and takes leaps of faith to move from one stage to another.

References

Further reading 
 Köhler, Stefanie & Hotz-Davies, Ingrid. “Writing Cures? Doris Lessing’s Golden Notebook and Lodge’s Therapy.” Psychoanalytic-ism. Uses of Psycho-analysis in Novels, Poems, Plays and Films. Ed. Ingrid Hotz-Davies & Anton Kirchhofer. Trier: WVT, 2000. 132-145.
 McLeod, John. “Postmodern Narrative Therapy: A Case Example.” Narrative and Psychotherapy. London: Sage, 1997. 127-137.

1995 British novels
Adaptations of works by Søren Kierkegaard
Novels by David Lodge
Metafictional novels
Novels about writers
Secker & Warburg books
Novels about midlife crisis